Sayyed (the word Sayyed also spelt Sayed, Sayyid, Seyyed, Syed,) is one of the clerical and religious  in Afghanistan and Pakistan.

It is believed that Sayeds are the descendants of the Islamic prophet Muhammad, who had traveled from Arab countries to other countries during the time of Muhammad to spread Islam.

The most famous Sayed in the modern history is Sayed Ismael Balkhi, who was one of the leaders of the Hazaras in Afghanistan in the 20th Century.

Famous people from Sayed Hazara 
 Sayed Ismael Balkhi
 Haji Sayed Hussain Hazara
 Sayed Mansur Naderi
 Sayed Nasir Ali Shah
 Aryana Sayeed
 Sayed Askar Mousavi
 Abdul Qayyum Sajjadi
 Sayed Anwar Rahmati
 Abrar Hussain (boxer)
 Sayed Hassan Akhlaq
 Sayyid Ali Beheshti
 Sayyed Mohammad Eqbal Munib
 Sayed Mustafa Kazemi

See also 

 Hazara tribes
 Hazara people

References 

Hazara tribes